BlockFi is a digital asset lender founded by Zac Prince and Flori Marquez in 2017. It is based in Jersey City, New Jersey. It was once valued at $3 billion.

In July 2022, it was announced that the cryptocurrency exchange FTX made a deal with an option to buy BlockFi for up to $240 million. The deal included a $400 million credit facility for the company.

In November 2022, after the declaration of bankruptcy by FTX, the company halted withdrawals on its platform. The firm disclosed "significant exposure" to FTX on November 14. The next day, the Wall Street Journal reported that BlockFi would likely file for bankruptcy, which was reaffirmed by reports compiled by Bloomberg News. On November 28, BlockFi confirmed the reports and officially filed for Chapter 11 bankruptcy protection with more than 100,000 creditors, according to filings. In March 2023, following the collapse of Silicon Valley Bank, the U.S. Trustee watchdog overseeing BlockFi's bankruptcy revealed that BlockFi had around $227 million in uninsured funds at the bank.

References

External links

2017 establishments in New Jersey
Companies based in Jersey City, New Jersey
Cryptocurrency companies
Companies that filed for Chapter 11 bankruptcy in 2022